Afon Melynllyn is the outflow from Llyn Melynllyn, a lake in the Carneddau mountains  in north-west Wales.  It is a tributary of Afon Dulyn, itself a tributary of the river Conwy.

External links
 RouteYou.com: Afon Melynllyn

Melynllyn
Melynllyn